Kenneth John Robinson (26 April 1925 – 26 March 1994) was an English pianist, architect, journalist and broadcaster from Ealing best known for his acerbity. He presented BBC One's Points of View between 1965 and 1969 and was a panellist and occasional host of BBC Radio 4's Start the Week between 1971 and 1986.

Early life
Kenneth Robinson was born on 26 April 1925 in Ealing, and was educated at Ealing Grammar School. During the Second World War, he was a pianist in ENSA concert parties, though realised he was not good enough to make a career of it and so after the war, he wrote for The Croydon Advertiser, where he wrote caustic, Tynan-like reviews; his dismissal, according to his obituary in The Independent, was for refusing to learn shorthand and typing, though he said in a 1976 interview that he was fired for saying that And Then There Were None was "a play in which members of the cast are strangled and poisoned one by one - it is a pity more plays of this kind are not available to the amateur" before writing for Architect and Building News and then spending ten years with the Architectural Press, ending up as chief assistant editor for the Architects' Journal. In the mid-1950s he joined The Design Centre, where he found that lecture-goers preferred the humorous content of his lectures to the architectural content; he reasoned that this was because the "official" language and tone of voice differed from his own.

Career
Robinson started his career by presenting solo pieces on the foibles of architecture and language. He presented BBC One's Points of View between 1965 and 1969, and was the second of four Robinsons to present the programme (immediately following and preceding a returning Robert Robinson, and before Tony Robinson and Anne Robinson); he was fired from that programme due to the show's producer objecting to the frivolous way in which he referred to bananas. He had a stint as a presenter of religious programmes, but the producer found his tone too ironic for the subject matter. In 1971 he became a guest panellist and occasional host of BBC Radio 4's Start the Week and hosted its children's spin-off, If It's Wednesday It Must Be…. He was notorious for acerbity, once telling the editor of H&E naturist between a report from a nudist colony and an anthropologist's explanation of nudity attitudes among Amazonian primitive tribes that "I loathe and despise everything you stand for"; he was particularly acerbic towards women; he rowed with Anna Raeburn and Esther Rantzen, brought Angela Rippon to tears after dismantling her book about horses and disgusted Pamela Stephenson enough for her to empty a jug of water down his neck. He was suspended for six weeks in 1984 for making a joke about disabled people's sex lives (that a disabled people's dating agency would mean "you could hear the wheelchairs banging all night in some parts of the country"), for which the BBC issued a grovelling apology, but which amused Scope, who commissioned him to write a humorous book for the disabled; he was fired with three days notice in 1986, with his last programme airing on 16 June. In addition, he had a stage show, The Worst of Kenneth Robinson, a compilation programme of which, The Best of the Worst of Kenneth Robinson, aired on ITV in January 1975. He was also an occasional player on Just a Minute, and narrated Les Shadoks.

Personal life
Robinson was married to Mary Hargreaves, a banana heiress, from 1955 until his death. They had a son and a daughter. He died on 26 March 1994 from a short illness in Kingston Hospital.

References

1925 births
1994 deaths
People from Ealing
English radio personalities
BBC television presenters